The Canary is a left-wing news website based in the United Kingdom. While focusing on UK political affairs, it also has a "Global" section, a satire section ("Off the Perch"), and "Science", "Environment", and "Health" sections. Founded in 2015 by Kerry-Anne Mendoza and her wife Nancy Mendoza, the website increased in popularity around the time of the 2017 United Kingdom general election. It was initially funded through a combination of advertising and a group of about 1500 supporters, but by 2020 had moved to a largely reader-funded model.

According to Press Gazette, in July 2022 The Canary was the third most popular politics news website in the UK behind Politico and Politics Home.

History
According to editor-in-chief Kerry-Anne Mendoza, The Canary was created in October 2015 with five founding members in an attempt to "diversify the media". The website was funded by advertising and monthly contributions from around 1,500 supporters in August 2016. It published 9,000 articles in its first two years. According to Mendoza, a major factor motivating The Canary founders was scepticism of the mainstream media, a scepticism that was shared by Jeremy Corbyn, the leader of the Labour Party. In his first address as Labour leader, he attacked pundits, arguing that they did not understanding the discontent among many ordinary British voters, and talked about the "power of social media". Following the 2017 United Kingdom general election, the BBC reported that websites "such as The Canary, The Skwawkbox, and Another Angry Voice are making a huge impact and earning a massive following" and such sites were considered to have contributed to sensationalist reporting of the election.

In September 2020, The Canary announced it would fund a new investigative unit staffed by two journalists for six months. In a statement, it said "A reader-funded investigative unit that is responsive to the requests and demands of The Canary readership is something people have asked us for since our inception. We believe this unit will be of value to our existing readers and attract new readers. We hope they will work with us to secure funding to continue the unit after the initial six months." Drew Rose, formerly director of operations, became editor-in-chief, replacing Bex Sumner. Rose said the site had survived the "decimation" of its advertising income and "politically-motivated attacks on our staff", and had shifted to a 95% reader-funded model. In July 2021, Mendoza stepped down as director and editor-at-large, handing over her shares in Canary Media Limited to colleagues. She was named as chief operating officer and Emily Apple as senior editor.

Political standpoint
The Canary is left-leaning and is frequently sceptical of the mainstream British press. It was generally supportive of former labour leader Jeremy Corbyn. In common with other left-wing alternative media in the United Kingdom, its stance towards the Labour leadership became more critical after Corbyn stepped down and Keir Starmer won the 2020 Labour Party leadership election.

Describing her website to Journalism.co.uk, Canary editor-in-chief Kerry-Anne Mendoza said: "For us, this is ultimately about democracy. Informed consent in the public is the bedrock of democracy, and if that informed consent isn't there because people aren't aware of the kind of information that they need to be, they won't be equipped to make the decent democratic decisions that they need to, say, for example, on climate change, the justice system, or whether austerity is a positive economic policy." Mendoza stated it was "a complete coincidence" that the website was created shortly after Corbyn's leadership victory, and added: "We don't have any affiliations with political parties, we don't have any affiliations with political organisations, and we're not actually ostensibly left-wing." She called the site's editorial stance "a counterpoint to conservative media" and "broadly liberal". Mendoza also stated that The Canary was "biased in favour of social justice, equal rights – those are non-negotiable things. We're in this as an issue-driven organisation. ... Every press organisation has an editorial stance and we're certainly no different."

Regulation and accuracy
In August 2017, The Canary joined the voluntary state-approved press regulator IMPRESS. In its first year with the regulator, The Canary was the most complained about IMPRESS member, but the regulator upheld just two of the 58 complaints they received during 2017–2018 about its news reporting. In April 2019, The Canary was given an overall pass rating and a pass on eight out of nine factors (it failed on "handles the difference between news and opinion responsibly") by NewsGuard, an organisation which evaluates news outlets for trustworthiness.

A 2018 study by the Reuters Institute for the Study of Journalism described The Canary as "a left-wing partisan site" and an example of "alternative and partisan brands" which have "a political or ideological agenda and their user base tends to passionately share these views." Its trust rating was given as 4.69 where 10 is fully trusted, making it more trusted than the Daily Mail, Buzzfeed News, and The Sun but less than the Daily Mirror, the regional press, or any broadsheet newspaper, although its trust level among its own users was at 6.65 (a similar level to The Independent, The Daily Telegraph, and the regional press).

In response to criticism, Mendoza said: "We are human beings and we make mistakes. We clean up the mess and make sure it's clear to our readership." On 14 March 2019, The Canary said that it had produced 10,000 articles since its creation and two of its articles required deletion after editorial review, representing 0.02% of its content.

Business model
In April 2016, Mendoza said in Free & Fearless (a magazine produced by Hacked Off) that "we are attracting an audience of 3.5 million unique users per month. On top of this: every two hours, 24 hours a day, seven days a week – someone becomes a paid subscriber of The Canary. ... Our growing traffic is attracting advertisers who are now offering us a floor RPM (payment per 1,000 hits) of £3 and a ceiling of £9." According to The Canarys FAQ, around half of the website's revenue is raised from online advertising, and the other half from reader subscriptions. According to one journalism lecturer, while the website is skilled at promoting its stories, the primary reason for its viral popularity may be its political standpoint.

In its FAQ, the website explains its business model, as "Each writer and section editor is paid in two ways. Firstly, each and every article receives a flat-rate equal payment from our monthly income from supporters. So with each new supporter, the pay per article goes up for everyone every month. Secondly, each article receives a top-up payment based directly on the percentage of web traffic, and therefore advertising income, that articles generate during a given calendar month." This pay-per-click model has been criticised for promoting clickbait as writers are only paid for their work if it becomes viral. Mendoza disputes this, saying that the payment structure means that people who generate the revenues get a fair share.

During 2016–2018, the website had an editorial team of around 30, although only five of The Canary staff earn enough money to work full-time. It had an annual turnover of £250,000 in 2016. In August 2019, The Canary emailed users to announce that it would rely more on its team and less on freelance contributors due to a reduced income. After the email was shared online, Mendoza said on Twitter that by the middle of this August the website would "leave the gig economy". The Canary said this was due to Facebook and Google changing their algorithms, which reduced the site's traffic and therefore advertising income, and to the campaign to persuade advertisers to blacklist the site. It said it was "susceptible to pressure from political Zionists, and our advertising revenue is under fire." The Canary mounted a recruitment drive for one thousand additional subscribers, which it reported it had achieved by early August, saying this had secured its immediate future.

In October 2022 staff at the organisation announced that they had "overthrown" the site’s management and had been running the publisher as a co-operative since June of that year, after discovering evidence of "gross inequalities and gross mismanagement that was rampant in the company".

Reception
In 2016, Carl Miller of Demos has said that, while the "digital world" has been "democratizing", he believes that sites such as The Canary, which reflect a single worldview, cut down on dissenting information and are likely to make people "even angrier, more outraged, more certain that that  people we disagree with are evil ... which isn't good for reasoned, civil debate." In January 2017, Owen Jones told PR Week that the website "promotes conspiracy theories and a lot of things that just aren't right. I worry about the Canary-isation of the left, where it ends up in a bizarre sub-culture that anyone who doesn't agree is seen as part of a conspiracy. But then you do get those blogs on left and right." In July 2017, Len McCluskey, the general secretary of Unite the Union, said to the Morning Star: "The media needs regulating, the control of information shouldn't be in the hands of a few billionaires. Alternative media needs supporting ... . But I'd support everything that chips away at Establishment control of the narrative — The Canary, the Skwawkbox, all of it."

In September 2017, Nick Robinson of the BBC listed the website, along with right-wing sites such as Westmonster, among alternative news sites waging a "guerrilla war" against the BBC to promote an anti-establishment agenda. Drew Rose, The Canarys director of operations, responded that "Nick Robinson's analogy that we are waging a 'guerrilla war' is apt – but it's not the war he suggests. ... For years now, swaths of the population have been ignored or otherwise failed by the established media. We're fighting to serve those people. We're doing that by helping to build a more diverse media operating outside of the establishment."

In November 2020, Leeds University political scientist Jonathan Dean wrote that "websites such as Evolve Politics, Skwawkbox and The Canary have aped a more tabloid style, with short, punchy headlines and an often rather sensationalised style of reporting. The Canary, in particular, has faced criticism for its highly partisan presentation of political news stories, with critics often deeming it symptomatic of the rise of so-called 'fake news' ... ."

Allegations of antisemitism
In early 2019, the campaign organisation Stop Funding Fake News (SFFN) described The Canary as promoting conspiracy theories, defending antisemitism, and publishing fake news. SFFN launched a campaign to pressure advertisers not to allow their ads to run on certain websites. SFFN persuaded Macmillan Cancer Support to suspend advertising on The Canary while it reviewed online ad placement. Then-MP Chris Williamson described the SFFN's campaign against The Canary as "sinister". In March 2020, advertising for Tom Stoppard's play Leopoldstadt, which is about the legacy of the Holocaust, was removed from The Canary after allegations of antisemitism from SFFN. In response to criticism from SFFN, The Canary co-founder Nancy Mendoza, who is Jewish, said that The Canary had taken a position of solidarity with the Palestinian people, and was therefore critical of the Israeli government and of Zionism, but that it was firmly opposed to antisemitism.

In January 2021, Antisemitism and the Alternative Media, a report by Daniel Allington and Tanvi Joshi, academics at King's College London, commissioned by John Mann, Baron Mann, the UK government's independent advisor on antisemitism, stated that The Canary, alongside The Skwawkbox, "promote[s] a negative view of Jews" and views "life [as] a struggle between the oppressors and the oppressed, which leaves an in-group of 'socialists' – i.e. those who understand themselves to side with the oppressed – at constant risk of attack from a politically-defined Zionist enemy that must be driven out of the Labour Party." The authors of the report said that a quote from one of The Canarys co-founders "characterise[s] Israel as a European settler state, suggesting that practically every aspect of Israel is racist." In response, the press regulator IMPRESS began a preliminary investigation into both websites, reviewing 41 articles and one tweet from the two publications to assess whether they were in breach of the IMPRESS Standards Code Clause on discrimination.

In November 2021, IMPRESS released its findings that the material that they reviewed was "not sensationalist and does not use language that is likely to provoke hatred or put a person or group in fear, nor does it appear to be intended to have that effect. Those that disagree with the Publisher's views on subjects such as Zionism may find these views offensive, adversarial or provocative but this in and of itself does not rise to the level of threat to, or targeting of, persons or groups on the basis of their protected characteristics as envisaged by the Code." IMPRESS dismissed the matter after finding that "of the material in remit, none of it reached the threshold which would engage the discrimination clause and, therefore, further investigation would be unjustified".

Notable articles
The Canary has published a number of stories which have been notable enough to be picked up by mainstream media outlets.

Electoral fraud investigations
Following the 2015 United Kingdom general election, The Canary "dug into assorted expense claims and activities in (target) seats", according to Michael White in The Guardian, after a whistleblower contacted the website to allege illegal telephone push polling by the Conservatives.

Portland Communications story
In June 2016, a Canary article saying that the 2016 parliamentary revolt against Corbyn "appears to have been orchestrated" by Portland Communications went viral and was repeated by Len McCluskey on Andrew Marr's Sunday morning BBC programme. The article listed links between partners and employees of the PR firm, where Alastair Campbell is a senior advisor, and members of the centre-left Fabian Society and other politicians on the right of the Labour Party, without providing evidence that the firm had organised the revolt.

Laura Kuenssberg
The Canary has been critical of Laura Kuenssberg's coverage of Jeremy Corbyn, and BBC News politics coverage more generally. The website promoted a petition calling for Kuenssberg's resignation, hosted by 38 Degrees. 38 Degrees later took the petition down, with the agreement of the originator, saying that the petition "had become a focal point for sexist and hateful abuse made towards Laura Kuenssberg on Twitter." The Canary reported Craig Murray's view that the petition was probably taken down due to "Establishment pressure", while ethical entrepreneur Ian Middleton wrote in The Huffington Post that "if one looks at the list of comments published ... it's difficult to find anything remotely aggressive or sexist", and the accusations of abuse "may have been part of an orchestrated campaign on behalf of those looking to discredit the petition itself."

In the fourteen months between the withdrawal of the petition in May 2016 and 20 July 2017, according to Jasper Jackson of the New Statesman, The Canary ran "at least 17 articles criticising Kuenssberg. In September 2017, The Canary published an inaccurate headline that "(Kuenssberg's) listed as a speaker at the Tory Party conference". Although the article itself stated correctly that she had been invited to speak at a fringe event, the website made several changes to its article after it was first published, without detailed clarifications. The Canary later modified its headline and added a statement released by the BBC in response, stating that she would not be speaking. In December 2017, the press regulator IMPRESS adjudicated that the website had broken its code by publishing an inaccurate headline, not making sufficient efforts to check the facts, and failing to correct the inaccuracy with due prominence. During the IMPRESS investigation, two board members were recused after publicly criticising Kuenssberg. The Canarys tweet remained online and was widely shared on social media.

Carl David Goette-Luciak
In September 2018, The Canary republished an article by Max Blumenthal (originally published by MintPress News) attacking Nicaragua-based Carl David Goette-Luciak, a freelance journalist reporting on anti-government protests for The Guardian, days after the Committee to Protect Journalists warned that that Goette-Luciak was the victim of a "targeted online harassment campaign" by supporters of the government. Shortly afterwards, Goette-Luciak was detained, interrogated and deported. The Canary published a further article by Blumenthal attacking the reporter, and a lecture by The Canarys editor due to be given at The Guardians offices was protested against by the National Union of Journalists and subsequently cancelled, leading to some controversy.

Readership
During July 2016, The Canary achieved over 7.5 million page views, ranking 97th in readership among British media organisations, slightly higher than The Spectator and The Economist. The site's publishers, Canary Media, rose 47 spots from 126th in June to 79th in July among the top UK publishers. By June 2020, the site had fallen out of the top 1,000 with just over 600,000 pageviews. The majority of its site traffic comes from Facebook.

A 2018 study by the Reuters Institute for the Study of Journalism found The Canary to be used by 2% of the UK news audience, compared with The Times website on 5% or The Guardian on 15%. Its readers were more left wing than readers of all but one other publication in the survey.

According to Press Gazette, in July 2022 The Canary had a readership of 654,000, with 2.3 million page views, and reached 1.31% of the UK population, making it the third most popular politics news website in the UK behind Politico and Politics Home.

See also
The London Economic
Paul Staines

References

Further reading

External links
 

2015 establishments in the United Kingdom
Alternative journalism organizations
British news websites
British political websites
Internet properties established in 2015
Left-wing politics in the United Kingdom
Mass media in Bristol